Computer Era is an extended play by American hip hop artist Astro. The EP was released on December 2, 2014, by Grade A Tribe Records. The EP was supported by the lead single "Champion"

Release and promotion 

Astro premiered "Champion" on BET's 106 & Park on December 2.

Track listing

References

2014 EPs
Astro (rapper) albums